Anna Margaretta Archambault (1856–1956) was an American artist and author. She is best known for her 1924 book A Guide Book of Art, Architecture, and Historic Interests in Pennsylvania, which remains in print as of 2020.

Life
Born in 1856 in Philadelphia, Pennsylvania, she undertook studies at the Miss Anne Longstreth's School for Girls, the Pennsylvania Academy of Fine Arts in Philadelphia and at the Académie Julian in Paris. Thomas Eakins, Thomas Hovenden and Benjamin Constant were her later professors.

Archambault died on June 30, 1956, at Christ Church Hospital in Philadelphia.

Collections 
Her miniature portrait paintings are included in the collections of the Smithsonian American Art Museum, the Philadelphia Museum of Art and the Pennsylvania Academy of the Fine Arts. 

Her personal papers are included in the Smithsonian's Archives of American Art and in the collection of the Historical Society of Pennsylvania.

References

External links
 

1856 births
1956 deaths
Artists from Philadelphia
19th-century American women artists
20th-century American women artists
Miniature painting